María José Urzúa O'Ryan (born 1983) is a Chilean actress. She is the only daughter of the actress Sandra O'Ryan. She studied Theatre at Universidad del Desarrollo following her mother's steps. In 2005 joined TVN making a role in the telenovela Versus with Francisco Melo and Cristián Arriagada. María José was nominated for "Best Actress" in Apes Awards. Actually joined MEGA in the comedy/drama show called Otra Vez Papá.

Filmography

TV series
El Día menos pensado "El camino" (TVN, 2006) - Lucía
Otra Vez Papá (MEGA, 2009) - Camila

Telenovelas
Versus (TVN) (2005) - Javiera Fuentealta
Floribella (TVN) (2006) - Lily

References

External links 
Galerías en TVN

1983 births
Chilean telenovela actresses
Chilean television actresses
Chilean people of Basque descent
Chilean people of Irish descent
Living people
Actresses from Santiago
University for Development alumni